Xylopia is a genus of flowering plants in the family Annonaceae. They are mostly trees and some shrubs. There are about 160 species distributed in Asia, Africa, and the Americas.

Accepted species

 Xylopia acutiflora,  (Dunal) A.Rich.
 Xylopia aethiopica,  (Dunal) A.Rich.
 Xylopia africana, Oliv.
 Xylopia amazonica, R.E.Fr.
 Xylopia ambanjensis, Cavaco & Keraudren
 Xylopia amoena, R.E. Fr.
 Xylopia amplexicaulis, (Lam.) Baill.
 Xylopia arenaria, Engl.
 Xylopia aromatica, (Lam.) Mart.
 Xylopia aurantiiodora, De Wild. & T.Durand
 Xylopia barbata, Mart.
 Xylopia beananensis, Cavaco & Keraudren
 Xylopia bemarivensis, Diels
 Xylopia benthamii, R.E.Fr.
 Xylopia bocatorena,  Schery
 Xylopia brasiliensis, Spreng.
 Xylopia buxifolia, Baill.
 Xylopia calophylla, R.E.Fr.
 Xylopia capuronii, Cavaco & Keraudren
 Xylopia caudata, Hook.f. & Thomson
 Xylopia cayennensis, Maas
 Xylopia chrysophylla, Louis ex Boutique
 Xylopia collina, Diels
 Xylopia columbiana, R.E.Fr.
 Xylopia conjungens, R.E. Fr.
 Xylopia coriifolia, Ridl.
 Xylopia crinita, R.E. Fr.
 Xylopia cupularis, Mildbr.
 Xylopia cuspidata, Diels
 Xylopia danguyella, Ghesq. ex Cavaco & Keraudren
 Xylopia decorticans, D.M. Johnson & Lobão
 Xylopia dehiscens, (Blanco) Merr.
 Xylopia densiflora, R.E. Fr.
 Xylopia densifolia, Elmer
 Xylopia dielsii, Cavaco & Keraudren
 Xylopia discreta, (L.f.) Sprague & Hutch.
 Xylopia egleriana, Aristeg. ex Maas
 Xylopia elliotii, Pierre ex Engl. & Diels
 Xylopia elliptica, Maingay ex Hook.f. & Thomson
 Xylopia emarginata, Mart.
 Xylopia excellens, R.E.Fr.
 Xylopia fananehanensis, Cavaco & Keraudren
 Xylopia ferruginea, (Hook.f. & Thomson) Baill.
 Xylopia ferruginea var. oxyantha, (Hook. f. & Thomson) J. Sinclair  
 Xylopia flamignii, Boutique
 Xylopia flexuosa, Diels
 Xylopia frutescens, Aubl.
 Xylopia fusca, Maingay ex Hook.f. & Thomson
 Xylopia gilbertii, Boutique
 Xylopia humblotiana, Baill.
 Xylopia hypolampra, Mildbr.
 Xylopia katangensis, De Wild.
 Xylopia kuchingensis, I.M.Turner & D.M.Johnson
 Xylopia laevigata, (Mart.) R.E. Fr.
 Xylopia lamii, Cavaco & Keraudren
 Xylopia langsdorfiana, St.Hilaire & Tulasne
 Xylopia lastelliana, Baill.
 Xylopia latipetala, Verdc.
 Xylopia le-testui, Pellegr.
 Xylopia lemurica, Diels
 Xylopia lenombe, Paiva
 Xylopia ligustrifolia, Dunal
 Xylopia longicuspis, R.E. Fr.
 Xylopia longipetala, De Wild. & T.Durand
 Xylopia macrantha, Triana & Planch.
 Xylopia madagascariensis, Cavaco & Keraudren
 Xylopia malayana, Hook.f. & Thomson
 Xylopia micans, R.E. Fr.
 Xylopia mildbraedii, Diels
 Xylopia mucronata, Boerl.
 Xylopia multiflora, R.E.Fr.
 Xylopia mwasumbii, D.M. Johnson
 Xylopia nervosa,  (R.E. Fr.) Maas
 Xylopia nitida, Dunal
 Xylopia ochrantha, Mart.
 Xylopia odoratissima, Welw. ex Oliv.
 Xylopia orestera,  I.M.Turner & D.M.Johnson
 Xylopia orinocensis, Bagstad & D.M.Johnson
 Xylopia panamensis, G.E. Schatz
 Xylopia paniculata, Exell
 Xylopia parviflora, Spruce
 Xylopia peruviana, R.E. Fr.
 Xylopia phloiodora, Mildbr.
 Xylopia pierrei, Hance
 Xylopia pittieri, Diels
 Xylopia plowmanii, Xylopia plowmanii 
 Xylopia polyantha, R.E. Fr.
 Xylopia pulchella, Ridl.
 Xylopia pulcherrima, Sandwith
 Xylopia pynaertii, De Wild.
 Xylopia quintasii, Pierre ex Engl. & Diels
 Xylopia rubescens, Oliv.
 Xylopia rubescens var. klaineana, Pellegr.
 Xylopia sahafariensis, Cavaco & Keraudren
 Xylopia sericea, A.St.-Hil.
 Xylopia sericolampra, Diels
 Xylopia sericophylla, Standl. & L.O. Williams
 Xylopia spruceana, Benth. ex Spruce
 Xylopia staudtii, Engl. & Diels
 Xylopia stenopetala, Oliv.
 Xylopia strilophylla,  Standl.
 Xylopia subdehiscens (King) J.Sinclair
 Xylopia surinamensis, R.E. Fr.
 Xylopia talbotii, Exell
 Xylopia tomentosa, Exell
 Xylopia toussaintii, Boutique
 Xylopia trichostemon, R.E. Fr.
 Xylopia venezuelana, R.E. Fr.
 Xylopia vielana, Pierre
 Xylopia villosa, Chipp
 Xylopia wilwerthii, De Wild. & T.Durand
 Xylopia xylantha, R.E. Fr.

Unresolved species

 Xylopia acunae, Borhidi & E.Del-Risco
 Xylopia aligustrifolia, Dunal
 Xylopia altissima, Boerl.
 Xylopia ardua, Sillans
 Xylopia batesii, Pierre ex Engl. & Diels
 Xylopia brasiliensis var. gracilis, .E.Fr.
 Xylopia cacanes, Warm.
 Xylopia calosericea, Diels
 Xylopia championii, Hook.f. & Thomson
 Xylopia chivantinensis, Aristeg.
 Xylopia chocoensis, R.E.Fr.
 Xylopia congolensis, De Wild.
 Xylopia cristalensis, Alain
 Xylopia cubensis, A.Rich.
 Xylopia degeneri, A.C.Sm.
 Xylopia dibaccata, Däniker
 Xylopia dunaliana, Vallot
 Xylopia dunaliana, Planch. & Linden
 Xylopia dunaliana, L.Linden, Planch. & Sprague
 Xylopia ekmanii, R.E.Fr.
 Xylopia ghesquiereana, Cavaco & Keraudren
 Xylopia glauca, Boerl.
 Xylopia gracilis, (R.E.Fr.) R.E.Fr.
 Xylopia hastarum, M.L.Green
 Xylopia holtzii, Engl.
 Xylopia humbertii, Ghesq. ex Cavaco & Keraudren
 Xylopia hypolampsa, Mildbr. & Diels
 Xylopia involucrata, M.C.Dias & Kin.-Gouv.
 Xylopia jamaicensis, Griseb.
 Xylopia javanica, Steud.
 Xylopia kalabenonensis, D.M.Johnson, Deroin & Callm.
 Xylopia lanceola, Ridl.
 Xylopia lanceolata, R.E.Fr.
 Xylopia lucida, Baill.
 Xylopia maccraei, L.B. Sm.

 Xylopia maccreai, (F.Muell.) L.S.Sm.
 Xylopia maccreai, F.Muell.
 Xylopia macrocarpa, A.Chev.
 Xylopia magna, Maingay ex Hook.f.
 Xylopia martinicensis, Spreng.
 Xylopia mendoncae, Exell
 Xylopia micrantha, Scheff.
 Xylopia monosperma, Jessup
 Xylopia nigricans, Hook.f. & Thomson
 Xylopia pacifica, A.C.Sm.
 Xylopia pallescens, Baill.
 Xylopia pancheri, Baill.
 Xylopia papuana,  Diels
 Xylopia parviflora, (Guill. & Perr.) Engl. & Diels
 Xylopia parvifolia, Hook.f. & Thomson
 Xylopia parvifolia, Schltdl.
 Xylopia patoniae, I.M.Turner
 Xylopia peekelii, Diels
 Xylopia pierrei, Hance
 Xylopia platypetala, R.E.Fr.
 Xylopia poggeana, Pierre ex Engl. & Diels
 Xylopia poilanei,  Ast
 Xylopia prancei, Aristeg.
 Xylopia pygmaea, Warm.
 Xylopia pyrifolia,  Engl.
 Xylopia richardii, Boivin ex Baill.
 Xylopia rigidiflora, Bagstad & D.M.Johnson
 Xylopia roigii, P.Wilson
 Xylopia salicifolia, Kunth
 Xylopia seretii, De Wild.
 Xylopia subdehiscens, (King) J.Sinclair
 Xylopia tenuifolia, Engl. & Diels
 Xylopia torrei, N.Robson
 Xylopia uniflora, R.E.Fr.
 Xylopia vieillardii, Baill.
 Xylopia vitiensis, A.C.Sm.

References

 
Annonaceae genera
Taxonomy articles created by Polbot